Hands On is a solo piano album by Paul Bley recorded in 1993 and released on the Japanese Transheart label.

Reception

Allmusic awarded the album 4 stars stating "Hands On reveals Paul Bley as an archetype -- an improvising jazz pianist who serves the larger model of an artist who meditates upon his work actively, restlessly, and relentlessly, seeking its core, until that work exhausts itself and gives way to become, finally, a work of art, original and unrepeatable".

Track listing
All compositions by Paul Bley
 "Remembering" - 8:46
 "Points" - 5:33
 "Ram Dance" - 8:50
 "Three Fifth" - 12:35
 "Hands On" - 6:48
 "If" - 4:48
 "Cowhand" - 4:58

Personnel 
Paul Bley - Imperial Bösendorfer piano

References 

1993 albums
Paul Bley albums
Solo piano jazz albums